Doti, also known as Doti region, Dotigarh (डोटीगढ़) as used in the Jagar (folk tales; जागर), in the Farwestern region of Nepal (Sudurpashchim Province), is a region situated between River Kali bordering Kumaon division of Uttarakhand, India in the west and the Karnali river on the east. Doti was one of eight different princely states of the Katyuri Kingdom.

Districts
Doti division covers the nine districts of Sudurpashchim Province. They are:
Darchula District
Baitadi District
Dadeldhura District
Kanchanpur District
Doti District
Kailali District
Bajhang District
Bajura District
Achham District

Kailali and Kanchanpur District are Terai districts and rest are hilly districts.

Etymology
The name Doti is believed to have originated from the word Doab which means the land area between the confluence of two rivers.

History
Doti was an ancient kingdom in far western region of Kumaon which was formed after the disintegration of the Katyuri  Kingdom of Kumaon around  the 13th century.

Doti was one of eight different princely states Katyuri Kingdom was divided into Eight for their eight Prince and became different independent Kingdom.
Baijnath-Katyur
Dwarahat
Doti
Baramandal
Askot
Sira
Sora
Sui (Kali kumaon)

Later on, the whole land between Ramganga on the west (Kumaon) and the Karnali on the east (which divides the far western region from other parts Nepal), came under the Raikas after the origin of Raikas of Katyuris in Doti.

"Brahma Dev Mandi" at Kanchanpur District of Mahakali Zone was established by Katyuri king Brahma Dev.

Raikas of Doti

Niranjan Malla Dev was the founder of Doti Kingdom around the 13th century after the fall of the Katyuri Kingdom. He was the son of Last Katyuris of united Katyuris kingdom.

Kings of Doti were called Raikas (also  Rainka Maharaj). Later on Raikas, after defeating the  Khas Malla of Karnali Zone, were able to establish a strong Raika Kingdom in Far Western Region and Kumaun which was Doti. So far, the historical evidences of following Raikas have been discovered:

Niranjan Malla Dev (Founder of Doti Kingdom)
Nagi Malla (1238) 
Ripu Malla (1279)
Nirai Pal (1353): maybe of Askot  his historical evidence of 1354 A.D has been found in Almora too
Nag Malla (1384)
Dhir Malla (1400)
Ripu Malla (1410)
Anand Malla (1430)
Balinarayan Malla: not known
Sansar Malla (1442)
Kalyan Malla (1443)
Suratan Malla (1478)
Kriti Malla (1482)
Prithivi Malla (1488)
Medini Jay Malla (1512)
Ashok Malla (1517)
Raj Malla (1539)
Arjun Malla/Shahi: not known but he was ruling Sira as Malla and Doti as Shahi
Bhupati Malla/Shahi (1558)
Sagaram Shahi (1567)
Hari Malla/Shahi (1581): last Raikas King of Sira
Rudra Shahi (1630)
Vikram Shahi (1642)
Mandhata Shahi (1671)
Raghunath Shahi (1690)
Hari Shahi (1720)
Hrishna Shahi (1760)
Deep Shahi (1785),
Prithivi pati Shahi (1790): he had fought against Nepali Ruler (Gorkhali Ruler) with British in 1814 A.D.

Mogul invasion on Far-Western Nepal
During the period of Akbar's rule in the 16th century, the Moguls had attacked the Raikas of Doti. They invaded Ajemeru, capital of the Raika Kingdom. Ajemeru is now in Dadeldhura District of far western region of Nepal. Hussain Khan, army chief of Akbar residing in Lucknow had led the attack. According to `Abd al-Qadir Bada'uni (c. 1540 - 1615), Indo-Persian historian during Mughal Empire, Mughal Army chief of Lucknow, Hussain Khan, lured by the wealth and treasures of the kingdom of the Raikas, wanted to plunder the state, this being the motive behind the assault; he managed to capture some cities and after his successful campaign he returned to Lucknow.

Gorkha Invasion
The historic place of war between the Doti Kingdom and Nepal (Gorkha Kingdom) during the period of Gorkha Expansion in 1790, according to the history of Nepal, is Nari-Dang which lies on the bank of the Seti River and Dumrakot was the base of the Doti Kingdom during the fighting against the Gorkhalis.
In the war with the Gorkhalis, the Doti kingdom was defeated and Doteli King fled to Pilibhit.

Khairgarh-Singhai State 
Raja Deep Shah of Surajbanshi clan was expelled from Nepal in 1790 A.D and on arriving to Terai of Oudh (now Lakhimpur Kheri District of Uttar Pradesh of India) he established Khairgarh-Singhai State in Khairigarh  under British India.
Kanchanpur Praganna  (now the District of Kaillali and Kanchanpur of Nepal) was also the parts of his State or Zamindari. He  succeeded in defeating the Banjaras rulers of Khairigarh and establishing himself not only in that Pargana but also in parts of Bhur

Geography
The Far-Western Development Region has the Mid-Western Development Region to the east, Uttar Pradesh (India) to the south, Uttarakhand (India) to the west and the Tibet Autonomous Region (People's Republic of China) to the north.

The most important rivers in the Far-Western Development Region are the Seti and the Mahakali ( Kali or Sharda in India) rivers; both rivers are tributaries of the Ghaghara or Karnali  river.

Demographics
Main ethnic group are Khas/Chhetri making total population of 76%.

Language and culture

Inhabitants of two terai districts Kailali District and Kanchanpur District speak  different languages. Rana-tharu and Dangaura-tharu speaks  their own  language. Language spoken by Rana-tharus is  Hindi Dialect and Dangaura-tharu speaks Tharu Language.

Traditional dance and songs Chholiya, Bhada, Jhora Chhapeli, Rung Culture of Rung people (Sauka), Baira song, Deuda, Chait and Jagar are part of the culture. Jagar and Chait tales of bravery is most important culture in Doti since Katyuri period. Chait tales about bravery of Senapati Piri Bohara (Doti) is singing in Gaura Parva . Jhusia Damai of Baskot of Baitadi District (stayed in Dharchula India) was famous Jagar singer. The major festivals of Doti are mainly Gora (Gamra), Kumaoni Holi, Bishpati, Harela, Raksha Bandhan (Rakhi) Dashin, Diwali, Makar Sankranti, and others.

See also
Doti District
Kumaon
Kumaoni people
Baitada

Further reading
 A New History of Uttarakhand Y. S. Kathoch 
 Dotiyali language
 Dotyali Dictionary by R. Chattaut
 Stars of Seti by Punya Nepal
 History of Karnali Zone by R. Subedi
 Article

References

Regions of Nepal
Geography of Nepal
Sudurpashchim Province
Empires and kingdoms of Nepal